Lithax is a genus of caddisflies belonging to the family Goeridae.

The species of this genus are found in Europe.

Species:
 Lithax atratula Ulmer, 1912 
 Lithax herrlingi Wichard & Sukatsheva, 1992

References

Integripalpia
Trichoptera genera